Sibyl and Prophet is a grisaille distemper painting by Andrea Mantegna c. 1495. It is now in the Cincinnati Art Museum.

History
Mantegna produced several grisailles in the last eleven years of his life; this style imitated relief sculpture and was then popular in the Mantuan court due to the duchy's lack of major sculptors and stone quarries. Possibly a fragment from a larger work, it was probably a commission by Isabella d'Este for her apartments and shows a sibyl in a crown and toga debating with a bearded Old Testament prophet who holds the scroll they are discussing.

References

Paintings by Andrea Mantegna
Collection of the Cincinnati Art Museum
1490s paintings